The Hindenburg Programme of August 1916 is the name given to the armaments and economic policy begun in late 1916 by the Third  (OHL, headquarters of the German General Staff), Field Marshal Paul von Hindenburg and General Erich Ludendorff. The two were appointed after the sacking of General Erich von Falkenhayn on 28 August 1916 and intended to double German industrial production, to greatly increase the output of munitions and weapons.

Background

Third OHL
Hindenburg and Ludendorff had demanded reinforcements from Falkenhayn to fight a decisive campaign against Russia and intrigued against Falkenhayn over his refusals. Falkenhayn held that decisive military victory against Russia was impossible and that the Western Front was the decisive theatre of the war. Soon after taking over from Falkenhayn, Hindenburg and Ludendorff had no choice but to recognise the wisdom of the emphasis given by Falkenhayn to the Western Front, despite the crisis in the east caused by the Brusilov Offensive (4 June – 20 September) and the Romanian declaration of war on 28 August.

Prelude

Cambrai conference

The Battle of Verdun and the Battle of the Somme had been extraordinarily costly; on the Somme,  casualties had been suffered from 24 June to 28 August. The Chief of Staff of the new  (Army Group German Crown Prince) reported that conditions at Verdun were little better and that the recruit depots behind the army group front could supply only  of the casualty replacements needed.

The 1st Army, on the north side of the Somme, reported on 28 August that

It was known in Germany that the British had introduced the Military Service Act 1916 (conscription) on 27 January 1916 and that despite the huge losses on the Somme, there would be no shortage of reinforcements. At the end of August, German military intelligence calculated that of the  divisions in France,  fresh. The French manpower situation was not as buoyant but by combing out rear areas and recruiting more troops from the colonies, the French could replace losses until the 1918 conscription class became available in the summer of 1917. Of the  divisions in France,  in reserve and another  could be obtained by swapping tired units for fresh ones on quiet parts of the front.

On 29 August, Hindenburg and Ludendorff reorganised the army groups on the Western Front, by incorporating all but the 4th Army in Flanders into the army group structure on the active part of the Western Front. The administrative reorganisation eased the distribution of men and equipment, yet made no difference to the lack of numbers and to the growing Franco-British superiority in weapons and ammunition. New divisions were needed and the manpower for them and replacements for the losses of 1916 had to be found.

Hindenburg Programme

Bureaucracy
The new body was intended to by-pass the War Ministry as well as create the structure of a command economy, with a militaristic organisation intended to facilitate management and a subordinate level of six departments organised along bureaucratic lines.

Army

Hindenburg and Ludendorff demanded domestic changes to complement their changes of strategy. The new programme was intended to treble artillery and machine-gun output and double munitions and trench mortar production. Expansion of the German Army and output of war materials caused increased competition for manpower by the army and industry. In early 1916, the German Army had  in recruit depots and another  in March, when the 1897 class of conscripts was called up. The army was so flush with men that plans were made to demobilise older  classes and in the summer, Falkenhayn ordered the raising of another  for an army of  The costly battles at Verdun and the Somme had been much more demanding on German divisions and they had to be relieved after only a few days in the front line, lasting about 14 days on the Somme. Hindenburg and Ludendorff ordered the creation of another 22 divisions, to have an army of 179 divisions by early 1917.

The men for the divisions created by Falkenhayn had come from reducing square divisions with four infantry regiments to triangular divisions with three, rather than a net increase in the number of men in the army. Troops for the extra divisions of the expansion ordered by Hindenburg and Ludendorff could be found by combing out rear-area units but most would have to be drawn from the pool of replacements, which had been depleted by the losses of 1916. Although new classes of conscripts would top up the pool of replacements, keeping units up to strength would become much more difficult once the pool had to maintain a larger number of divisions. By calling up the 1898 class of recruits early in November 1916, the pool was increased to  men in February 1917 but the larger army would become a wasting asset.

Ammunition
The German Army had begun 1916 equally well provided for in artillery and ammunition, massing  field and  heavy artillery shells for the beginning of the Battle of Verdun. Four million rounds were fired in the first fortnight and the 5th Army needed about  trains a day to replace consumption. Before the war and the Allied naval Blockade of Germany, nitrates for explosives manufacture had been imported from Chile. Production of propellants could continue only because of the industrialisation of the Haber process for the synthesis of nitrates from atmospheric nitrogen but this took time to achieve. Under Falkenhayn, the procurement of ammunition and artillery had been based on the output of propellants, since the manufacture of ammunition without sufficient propellants and explosive fillings was pointless. Hindenburg and Ludendorff wanted firepower to replace manpower and ignored the principle of matching means and ends.

Explosives
To meet existing demand and to feed new weapons, Hindenburg and Ludendorff wanted a big increase in propellant output to  a month. The industrial mobilisation needed to fulfil the Hindenburg Programme increased demand for skilled workers,  (recalled from the army) or exempted from conscription. The number of  increased from  men, of whom  deemed  (kv, fit for front line service), at the end of 1916 to  men in October 1917 and more than two million by November,  being kv. The demands of the Hindenburg Programme exacerbated the manpower crisis and constraints on the availability of raw materials meant that targets were not met.

War economy

The Hindenburg Programme was provided with a legal basis in the Auxiliary Service Law, implemented on 6 December. The German Army returned  workers to the war economy and exempted  from conscription from September 1916 to July 1917. Despite the shortfalls, by the summer of 1917, the  artillery park had increased from   guns and from   guns, many being newer models of superior performance. The greater output was insufficient to equip the new divisions and existing divisions which still had two artillery brigades with two regiments each, lost a regiment and the brigade headquarters, leaving three regiments. Against the new scales of equipment, British divisions in early 1917 had  and  machine-guns and the French  and  machine-guns.

Slave labour
The imposition of compulsory labour for prisoners of war and deported Belgian and Polish workers began in August 1915. Three decrees of increasing severity were issued between 15 August 1915 and 13 May 1916. On 26 October 1916, 729 people who were unemployed or "work-shy" were picked up and by the time that deportations ceased on 10 February 1917, 115 deportation operations had taken place. The hope of OHL to obtain 20,000 workers per week was not realised and only 60,847 deportations were achieved. The army took the Belgians to camps where a deliberately harsh regime was imposed to coerce the victims into signing employment contracts under duress to make them "volunteers". Conditions in the camps were so poor that in a few months, 1,316 inmates died; despite the rigours, only 13,376 Belgians capitulated, the odious treatment meted out by the Germans creating anger and bitterness, rather than docility. The Pope condemned the deportations and neutral opinion, particularly in the United States, was more outraged than at any time since the  massacres of August 1914. Well-attended rallies were held in many cities and attempts by the US President, Woodrow Wilson, to mediate a peace deal with the combatants were a failure. US opinion became overwhelmingly pro-Entente over the winter of 1916–1917.

Aftermath

Analysis
Ludwig von Mises called the Hindenburg Programme a command economy. Enterprises "not important to the war economy" were closed to supply more workers. Extensive concessions to the workers were included in the law, with the establishment of a committee to supervise its implementation. Hindenburg later denounced the concessions as insufficient and "positively harmful"; industrialists, looking forward to a captive workforce to exploit, were aghast at being compelled to work with workers' committees and conciliation organisations. The purpose of the law, to deny workers' mobility was thwarted and with it went the possibility of a centralised organisation of manpower. The super-profits anticipated by employers were limited by the prospect of improved pay and conditions being recognised as a valid reason to change jobs. The attempt by the third OHL to reorganise the war economy through compulsion was a failure but the law was effective in substituting workers of lesser physical fitness for those capable of military service. Concessions to organised labour were valuable in retaining the co-operation of the unions during the unrest of 1917.

The German army had reached its peak of manpower in 1916 and the Hindenburg Programme had been intended to reduce the burden on the remaining men by substituting machines. In 1917, the  had managed to withstand the attacks of the French and the British, while offensive operations had been conducted on the eastern and southern fronts. The coalition against Germany increased its output of war materiel even more than the increase of the Hindenburg Programme, an industrial competition that Germany could not win; the programme worsened the labour shortage in Germany. The theoretical changes in German defensive tactics had greater effect than the increase in the size of the army and the output of weapons. British attacks in 1917 were much more competent than those of 1916 but German defensive methods were adapted to negate the effect of the maturing of the British Expeditionary Force (BEF).

The change to a defence based on firepower, using the extra weapons and munitions produced by the Hindenburg Programme, needed more trains to carry ammunition to the front. On 28 July, the 4th Army fired  trains' worth of ammunition, exceeding the record  on the Somme. On 9 October, the 4th Army was firing  worth per day,  shells being fired during the battle. Men, horses and fuel were taken from agricultural production for the army and munitions, which caused food shortages and food price inflation, leading to Germany coming to the verge of starvation at the close of 1918.

See also

 National Economic Council (est. 1880–1881) established by Otto von Bismarck
 Total war
 Military–industrial complex

Explanatory notes

Citations

References

Books

Journals

Further reading

External links

 Auxiliary Service Law 1916 (English text)
 A. Ritschl, The Pity of Peace: Germany’s Economy at War, 1914–1918 and beyond

Economic history of Germany
Economic history of World War I
Economy of the German Empire
German Empire in World War I
Paul von Hindenburg